Dzernavichy (Dernovichi), also spelled Dzyornavichy or Dyornovichi, is an abandoned Belarusian village in Naroulia District, Gomel Region.

History
Founded in the 18th century, in 1939 it annexed the farm Krasilovka. In 1943, during World War II, it was interested by the underground activities of Soviet partisans and was partially burned and ransacked by the Waffen-SS, that established a stronghold there. It was liberated on November 30, after a battle.

in 1959 it had a population of 1,016, with 308 families. Following the 1986 nuclear disaster of Chernobyl, it was abandoned and, from 1988, included in the Polesie State Radioecological Reserve; a Belarusian nature reserve that adjoins the Chernobyl Exclusion Zone in Ukraine.

Geography
The village is located by the western shore of the Pripyat River, in front of Aravichy, between the cities of Pripyat, in Ukraine, and Naroulia.

See also
Ghost town

References

Populated places in Gomel Region
Minsk Voivodeship
Minsk Governorate
Ghost towns in the Polesie State Radioecological Reserve